Nicolas Fauré is a French professional rugby league footballer He played for Toulouse Olympique in Championship, as a .

References

1984 births
Living people
French rugby league players
Toulouse Olympique players
Rugby league props